The Today's Top 10 Award is given each year by the National Collegiate Athletic Association (NCAA) to honor ten former outstanding senior student-athletes. The award was previously known by three different names, each reflecting the number of recipients:
 Today's Top V Award or the Top Five Award (1973–1985)
 Today's Top VI Award (1986–1994)
 Today's Top VIII Award (1995–2013)

Below is a list of the recipients of the Today's Top 10 Award given each year by the National Collegiate Athletic Association (NCAA) since its inception in 1973. The names of these exceptional individuals are engraved in the Hall of Honor at the NCAA Hall of Champions on the NCAA Headquarters in Indianapolis, Indiana. Recognition in the NCAA Hall of Honor ensures these athletes are remembered.  They have reached the pinnacle of national athletic and academic success through their accomplishments. As of 2020, there are more than 480,000 NCAA student-athletes annually. This award recognizes the nation's best former student-athletes from every NCAA sport and division. Each year, the recipients are honored at the NCAA Convention.

Winter/spring sports considered include baseball, basketball, women's beach volleyball, fencing, golf, gymnastics, ice hockey, lacrosse, rifle, rowing, skiing, softball, swimming and diving, tennis, indoor and outdoor track and field, men's volleyball, women's water polo and wrestling.  Fall sports considered include cross country, field hockey, football, soccer, women's indoor volleyball and men's water polo.

List of recipients
This is a list of the recipients of the Today's Top 10 Award given each year by the National Collegiate Athletic Association (NCAA) since its inception in 1973. The names of these exceptional individuals are engraved in the Hall of Honor at the NCAA Hall of Champions on the NCAA Headquarters in Indianapolis, Indiana. Recognition in the NCAA Hall of Honor ensures these athletes are remembered.  They have reached the pinnacle of national athletic and academic success through their accomplishments. As of 2020, there are more than 480,000 NCAA student-athletes annually. This award recognizes the nation's best former student-athletes from every NCAA sport and division. Each year, the recipients are honored at the NCAA Convention.

2021 recipients

2020 recipients

2019 recipients

2018 recipients

2017 recipients

2016 recipients

2015 recipients

2014 recipients

Recipients
Recipients of the Top 10 Award include many notable athletes in the United States and include John Elway, Steve Young, Peyton Manning, Eli Manning, Doug Flutie, Tiki Barber, Cheryl Miller, Drew Brees, Kendall Coyne and Elena Delle Donne.

See also
List of recipients of Today's Top 10 Award
Senior CLASS Award (top student-athletes—in 10 sports—based on community, classroom, character, and competition)
NCAA Sportsmanship Award (student-athletes who have demonstrated one or more of the ideals of sportsmanship)
NCAA Woman of the Year Award (senior female student-athlete)
Walter Byers Scholarship (NCAA) (top male and female scholar-athletes)
Silver Anniversary Awards (former student-athletes)

References

External links
Today's Top 10 Award — NCAA website

NCAA awards
College sports trophies and awards in the United States
Student athlete awards in the United States
Awards established in 1973